National Tsing Hua University Nan-Da Campus  (NTHU Nan-Da Campus) is a university campus in East District, Hsinchu City, Taiwan of National Tsing Hua University.

History
The campus was originally established in April 1940 as a training institute for teachers of elementary, preschool and special education. 

In August 2005, the institution was renamed the National Hsinchu University of Education.

On 1 November 2016, the university was merged with National Tsing Hua University and become the Nan Da Campus of it.

Faculties
 College of Education
 Department of Education and Learning Technology
 Department of Physical Education
 Department of Early Childhood Education
 Department of Special Education
 Department of Educational Psychology and Counseling
 Graduate Institute of Human Resource Development
 Graduate Institute of e-Learning Technology
 College of Humanities, Social Sciences and Arts
 Department of Music 
 Department of Chinese Language and Literature 
 Department of English Instruction 
 Department of Arts and Design 
 Department of Environmental and Cultural Resources 
 Graduate Institute of Taiwan Languages and Language Education 
 College of Science
 Department of Applied Mathematics
 Department of Applied Science
 Graduate Institute of Computer Science
 Graduate Institute of Mathematics and Science Education

See also
 List of universities in Taiwan

References

External links

 

1940 establishments in Taiwan
National Tsing Hua University
Teachers colleges